Castêlo da Maia is a town (vila) and parish in Maia Municipality, Grande Porto, Portugal. According to the 2001 Census, it has 15,452 inhabitants.

Freguesias of Maia, Portugal
Towns in Portugal